Sarah Rowe (née Bridges; born September 10, 1993) is an American professional wrestler currently signed to WWE, where she performs on the SmackDown brand under the ring name Valhalla. From 2017 to 2019, she was a member of the stable The Riott Squad with Liv Morgan and Ruby Riott and performed under the name Sarah Logan.

Early life 
Sarah Bridges was born in Louisville, Kentucky, United States on September 10, 1993. She attended Jeffersonville High School in Jeffersonville, Indiana.

Professional wrestling career

Independent circuit (2011–2016) 
Bridges began her wrestling career in 2011, under the ring name Crazy Mary Dobson, with her first match being against Mickie Knuckles for the IWA East Coast promotion. She also pinned Viper in a ten-person tag team match in her debut in the American Pro Wrestling Alliance. Dobson then wrestled for various independent wrestling organizations across the United States and Europe including Insane Championship Wrestling, Shimmer Women Athletes, Ring of Honor, and Juggalo Championship Wrestling (JCW). On February 21, 2015, at JCW's Take Me Home show, Dobson teamed with Mad Man Pondo to defeat The Hooligans (Devin Cutter and Mason Cutter) to win the JCW Tag Team Championships.

WWE

Early appearances (2014–2017) 
Bridges made an appearance during a segment on the September 1, 2014, episode of Raw as the makeup artist for The Miz On November 17, Bridges made her NXT debut at the WrestleMania 33 Ticket Party, defeating Macey Estrella. On the January 11, 2017, episode of NXT, Bridges made her first televised appearance under her real name, teaming with Macey Evans in a losing effort against The Iconic Duo (Billie Kay and Peyton Royce) in a tag team match. Bridges returned on the June 7 episode of NXT under the ring name Sarah Logan, where she was defeated in singles competition by Royce. 

After being absent from NXT in-ring competition, Logan returned on the August 23 episode of NXT, where she was again defeated by Royce. On the October 25 episode of NXT, Logan participated in a battle royal to gain a spot at the fatal four-way match for the vacant NXT Women's Championship at NXT TakeOver: WarGames, in which she was unsuccessful, and turned out to be her last live broadcast appearance in NXT.

On June 16, 2017, Logan was announced as one of the first four participants competing in the Mae Young Classic. On August 28, Logan was eliminated in the first round by Mia Yim. On September 11, despite being eliminated from the tournament, Logan teamed with other eliminated competitors in a six-women tag team among them Santana Garrett and Marti Belle being defeated by Tessa Blanchard, Kay Lee Ray and Jazzy Gabert.

The Riott Squad (2017–2019) 

On the November 21, 2017, episode of SmackDown, Logan made her debut, along with Ruby Riott and Liv Morgan, by attacking both Becky Lynch and Naomi. On the same night, they interrupted a match between SmackDown Women's Champion Charlotte Flair and Natalya and attacked them both. The following week on SmackDown, the trio, now called The Riott Squad, made their in-ring debuts for the brand, defeating Flair, Natalya, and Naomi in a six-woman tag team match. 

Over the following months, The Riott Squad continued to compete against Flair and Naomi. On the December 19 episode of SmackDown, Logan and Riott lost to Flair and Naomi. On the January 16 episode of SmackDown, The Riott Squad defeated Flair, Naomi, and Becky Lynch. Logan then participated in the first women's Royal Rumble match at the Royal Rumble pay-per-view as the third entrant, but was eliminated by Molly Holly.

During the 2018 Superstar Shake-Up, The Riott Squad was drafted to Raw and caused the match between Bayley and Sasha Banks to end in a no contest. During the July 16 episode of Raw, Sarah picked up her first singles victory in WWE with a win over Ember Moon. Logan also debuted a new Viking-inspired gimmick, wearing war paint and the commentary team making several references to her "discovering her Viking heritage". On February 17, 2019, Logan and Morgan competed in a six–team Elimination Chamber match for the inaugural WWE Women's Tag Team Championship, at the namesake pay–per–view, where they were the third team eliminated by Nia Jax and Tamina but the eventual winners were Bayley and Sasha Banks. Logan competed at WrestleMania 35 in a women's battle royal match to decide the winner of a trophy, but after assuming she had won, Carmella eliminated her at the last moment.

Singles competition (2019–2020) 
On April 16, as part of the 2019 WWE Superstar Shake-up, Liv Morgan was moved to SmackDown, effectively ending The Riott Squad. Logan would transition into a singles competitor, debuting a new look and entrance theme, while also beginning a feud with Dana Brooke on Main Event, where they traded wins with one another. At Survivor Series on November 24, Logan was part of Team Raw and competed in the triple threat women's elimination match against Team SmackDown and Team NXT, where she was eliminated by Bianca Belair. On the January 6 episode of Raw, Logan began a feud with Charlotte Flair after she attacked her before their match and stepped on her robe. The following week, Logan was defeated by Flair while also declaring herself as an entrant in the Women's Royal Rumble match. At the event, she entered the Royal Rumble match at number 22 but was eliminated in less than 30 seconds by Flair. On the February 10 episode of Raw, Logan lost to Rhea Ripley in a squash match. 

Logan would then be the guest referee during Liv Morgan’s match against Ruby Riott, where she helped Morgan win by fast counting Riott. After the match, Logan would attack Morgan. Logan was announced as part of the Elimination Chamber match against Morgan, Riott, Natalya, Shayna Baszler and half of the WWE Women's Tag Team Champions Asuka for a chance at Becky Lynch's WWE Raw Women's Championship at WrestleMania 36. At the namesake pay–per–view, she was the third entrant, but the first to be eliminated by Baszler, who was the eventual winner, earning a shot at the Raw women's title and setting a record by eliminating every other woman, in what was essentially a squash match. On April 13, 2020 edition of Raw, Logan once again lost to Baszler in a Women's Money in the Bank qualifying match by referee’s decision after Baszler stomped Logan’s arm. On April 15, 2020, Rowe was released from her WWE contract as a result of budget cuts due to the COVID-19 pandemic.

On June 22, 2020, Rowe announced that she would be stepping away from professional wrestling "for the foreseeable future".

Valhalla (2022–present) 
On January 29, 2022, Rowe made a surprise return to WWE at the Royal Rumble, reprising her Sarah Logan character, entering the match at number 25, briefly reuniting with Morgan and lasting only 43 seconds until she was eliminated by The Bella Twins (Nikki and Brie Bella). Later in November she made a full-time return, joining The Viking Raiders and adopting the new ring name of Valhalla.

Other media 
Logan made her WWE video game debut as a playable character in WWE 2K19. She also appears in WWE 2K20. She will also be included in WWE 2K23 under the Valhalla gimmick, in a future DLC pack.

Personal life
On March 29, 2011, Bridges was involved in a car accident after a CSX train struck her white Chevy coupe on Route 62 in Charlestown, Indiana. She was airlifted to the hospital in Louisville.

During her time with WWE, Bridges began dating fellow wrestler Raymond Rowe (who wrestles under the ring name "Erik" as part of the tag team The Viking Raiders).  The pair were married on December 21, 2018, in a Viking themed wedding. On February 9, 2021, Bridges and Rowe welcomed a son named Raymond Cash Rowe.

Championships and accomplishments 
 American Pro Wrestling Alliance
 APWA World Ladies Championship (1 time)
 Juggalo Championship Wrestling
 JCW Tag Team Championship (1 time) – with Mad Man Pondo
 Pro Wrestling Illustrated
 Ranked No. 33 of the top 100 female wrestlers in the PWI Female 100 in 2018
 Resistance Pro Wrestling
 RPW Women's Championship (1 time)
 Samuel J. Thompson Memorial Women's Tournament (2015)

References

External links 

 
 
 
 

1993 births
American female professional wrestlers
Living people
People from Jeffersonville, Indiana
Professional wrestlers from Indiana
21st-century American women
21st-century professional wrestlers